Potanino is a rural locality (a village) in Yershovskoye Rural Settlement, Sheksninsky District, Vologda Oblast, Russia. The population was 17 as of 2002.

Geography 
Potanino is located 25 km north of Sheksna (the district's administrative centre) by road. Poddubye is the nearest rural locality.

References 

Rural localities in Sheksninsky District